The following is a partial list of current and former notable faculty of the Ateneo de Manila University (formerly known as the Escuela Municipal de Manila from 1859 to 1865 and the Ateneo Municipal de Manila from 1865 to 1891) in Quezon City, Philippines.

Faculty 

 Henedina Abad
 Efren Abueg
 Virgilio S. Almario
 Tomas Andres
 Gloria Macapagal Arroyo
 Lamberto V. Avellana
 Adolfo Azcuna
 Cesario Azucena
 Alfredo Bengzon
 Miguel Bernad, S.J.
 Joaquin Bernas, S.J.
 Jaime C. Bulatao
 Sedfrey Candelaria
 Michael M. Coroza
 Vincent de Jesus
 Horacio de la Costa, S.J.
 Assunta Cuyegkeng
 Fabian Dayrit
 Eduardo de los Angeles
 Francis Escudero
 Susan Fernandez
 Mikaela Fudolig
 Joseph Galdon, S.J.
 Louie Mar Gangcuangco
 Menardo Guevarra
 J. Hunter Guthrie
 Cielito Habito
 Ramon Paul Hernando
 Margie Holmes
 Amando Kapauan
 Antonio La Viña
 Bienvenido Lumbera
 James A. Martin, S.J.
 Buenaventura S. Medina Jr.
 Orlando S. Mercado
 John Courtney Murray, S.J.
 Bienvenido Nebres, S.J.
 Ambeth Ocampo
 Onofre R. Pagsanghan
 Francis Pangilinan
 Jericho Petilla
 Lorenzo Relova
 Danton Remoto
 James Reuter, S.J.
 Soledad Reyes
 Mari-Jo P. Ruiz
 Czarina Saloma
 Edgar Calabia Samar
 Karel San Juan, S.J.
 Lucio San Pedro
 Melencio Santa Maria
 Luis Antonio Tagle
 Nicanor Tiongson
 John Paul Vergara
 Nimfa C. Vilches
 Ben Hur Villanueva
 Cesar L. Villanueva
 Jose Ramon Villarin, S.J.
 George J. Willmann, S.J.
 Lydia Yu-Jose
 Fernando Zóbel de Ayala y Montojo
Tranquil Salvador III

University presidents and rectors 

 Fr. José Fernández Cuevas, S.J., 1859–1864
 Fr. Juan Bautista Vidal, S.J., July 30, 1864 – June 10, 1868
 Fr. Pedro Bertrán, S.J., June 11, 1868 – September 3, 1871
 Fr. José Lluch, S.J., September 4, 1871 – August 20, 1875
 Fr. Juan Bautista Heras, S.J., August 21, 1875 – December 31, 1881
 Fr. Pablo Ramón, S.J., January 1, 1881 – February 5, 1886
 Fr. Miguel Roses, S.J., February 6, 1886 – February 10, 1894
 Fr. Miguel Sedarra Mata, S.J., February 11, 1894 – June 8, 1901
 Fr. José Clos, S.J., June 9, 1901 – December 10, 1905
 Fr. Joaquín Añon, S.J., December 11, 1905 – October 30, 1910
 Fr. Joaquín Villalonga, S.J., October 31, 1910 – May 27, 1916
 Fr. Marcial Sola, S.J., May 28, 1916 – July 28, 1920
 Fr. Juan Villalonga, S.J., July 29, 1920 – June 14, 1921
 Fr. Francis X. Byrne, S.J., June 15, 1921 – July 23, 1925
 Fr. James J. Carlin, S.J.,  July 24, 1925 – August 10, 1927
 Fr. Richard A. O'Brien, S.J., August 11, 1927 – July 29, 1933
 Fr. Henry C. Avery, S.J., July 30, 1933 – February 25, 1937
 Fr. Carroll I. Fasy, S.J., February 26, 1937 – April 24, 1941
 Fr. Francis X. Reardon, S.J., April 25, 1941 – 1947
 Fr. William F. Masterson, S.J., May 14, 1947 – March 14, 1950
 Fr. James J. McMahon, S.J., March 15, 1950 – June 30, 1956
 Fr. Leo A. Cullum, S.J., July 31, 1956 – June 14, 1959
 Fr. Francisco Z. Araneta, S.J., June 15, 1959 – July 1, 1965
 Fr. James F. Donelan, S.J., July 2, 1965 – April 30, 1969
 Fr. Pacifico Ortiz, S.J., May 1, 1969 – November 14, 1970
 Fr. Francisco Z. Araneta, S.J., November 15, 1970 – August 11, 1972
 Fr. José A. Cruz, S.J., August 12, 1972 – March 31, 1984
 Fr. Joaquin G. Bernas, S.J., April 1, 1984 – March 31, 1993
 Fr. Bienvenido Nebres, S.J., April 1, 1993 – May 31, 2011
 Fr. Jose Ramon Villarin, S.J., June 1, 2011 – July 30, 2020
 Fr. Roberto C. Yap, S.J., August 1, 2020 – present

See also 
 :Category:Academic staff of Ateneo de Manila University
 List of Ateneo de Manila University alumni

References

External links 
 Official website of the Ateneo de Manila University
 Full list of current faculty members:
 Loyola Schools
 School of Humanities
 John Gokongwei School of Management
 School of Science and Engineering
 School of Social Sciences
 Professional Schools
 Law School
 Graduate School of Business
 School of Government
 School of Medicine and Public Health
 Basic education units
 Grade School
 High School

Academic staff of Ateneo de Manila University
People
Ateneo